The 2006–07 season was the 93rd season in Aris Thessaloniki F.C.'s existence. The club finished 4th in the Super League. The club qualified in to the UEFA Cup of the next season.

Aris Thessaloniki was eliminated in Fourth round of Greek Football Cup by Niki Volos.

First-team squad 

Table includes all players who were part of the team for that season

Competitions

Overall

Overview

{| class="wikitable" style="text-align: center"
|-
!rowspan=2|Competition
!colspan=8|Record
|-
!
!
!
!
!
!
!
!
|-
| Super League

|-
| Greek Cup

|-
! Total

Managers' overview

Guillermo Hoyos
{| class="wikitable" style="text-align: center"
|-
!rowspan=2|Competition
!colspan=8|Record
|-
!
!
!
!
!
!
!
!
|-
| Super League

|-
| Greek Cup

|-
! Total

Nikos Pasialis
{| class="wikitable" style="text-align: center"
|-
!rowspan=2|Competition
!colspan=8|Record
|-
!
!
!
!
!
!
!
!
|-
| Super League

|-
| Greek Cup

|-
! Total

Quique Hernández
{| class="wikitable" style="text-align: center"
|-
!rowspan=2|Competition
!colspan=8|Record
|-
!
!
!
!
!
!
!
!
|-
| Super League

|-
| Greek Cup

|-
! Total

Super League

League table

Results summary

Matches

Greek Football Cup

Fourth Round

Squad statistics

Appearances

Players with no appearances not included in the list.

Goals

References

  rsssf.com – Greece 2006/07
 slgr.gr – Team squad for the 2006–07 season
 slgr.gr – Players statistics for the 2006–07 season

External links

Greek football clubs 2006–07 season
2006-07